The 2010 Conference USA Football Championship Game was played on December 4, 2010, at Bright House Networks Stadium, now known as Spectrum Stadium, in Orlando, Florida.  The game was played between the UCF Knights, winner of Conference USA's East Division, and the SMU Mustangs, the winner the West Division.

UCF was seeking their second C-USA title, and hosting the game for the third time. SMU was experiencing their second consecutive winning season, and their third one since returning from the "death penalty" in 1989. It would be SMU's first attempt to win a conference title since 1984, when they won a share of the Southwest Conference championship.

2009 season 
The 2009 Conference USA Football Championship Game on December 5, 2009, consisted of the East Carolina Pirates, the champion of Conference USA's East Division, beating the West Division champion Houston Cougars at Dowdy–Ficklen Stadium in Greenville, North Carolina by a score of 38 to 32.

Match-up History 
This was the third time the UCF Knights and the SMU Mustangs met on the football field. The previous to match-up proved UCF victorious at home by a score of 31–17 in the regular season. SMU up on till this point has not bested UCF in a football game.

Game summary
Under conference rules, the game was held at the home field of the team with the best record in conference play; since UCF finished C-USA play at 7–1, better than SMU's 6–2, the game was held at the Knights' home field.

Scoring summary

Statistics

References 

Conference USA Championship
Conference USA Football Championship Game
SMU Mustangs football games
UCF Knights football games
Sports competitions in Orlando, Florida
Conference USA Football Championship Game
Conference USA football
2010s in Orlando, Florida